Park Hye-su (born November 24, 1994), also spelled as Park Hye-soo, is a South Korean actress and singer. She participated in K-pop Star 4 as a contestant. 
Park rose to fame for her role in Hello, My Twenties!. She took on her first lead role in ''Introverted Boss.

Filmography

Film

Television series

Variety show

Music video appearances

Discography

Singles

Awards and nominations

Notes

References

External links

 
 
 
 
 Park Hye-su at Huayi Brothers 

1994 births
Living people
K-pop singers
South Korean film actresses
South Korean television actresses
South Korean female idols
South Korean women pop singers
South Korean rhythm and blues singers
K-pop Star participants
Singers from Seoul
Actresses from Seoul
21st-century South Korean singers
21st-century South Korean women singers
Korea University alumni